Zahir ( Ẓāhir) may refer to:

Philosophy
Aẓ-Ẓāhir, one of the names of God in Islam, meaning "Evident" or "Outer".
Zahir (Islam), in Islam, the exterior, surface, or apparent meaning of things
Ẓāhiri, a school of thought in Islamic Jurisprudence

Artistic works
"The Zahir" (in the original Spanish, "El Zahir"), a 1949 short story by Argentine writer Jorge Luis Borges
The Zahir (novel) (in the original Portuguese, O Zahir), a 2005 novel from the Brazilian writer Paulo Coelho

People
Zahir (surname)

Al-Zahir li-i'zaz Din Allah (1005–1036), seventh caliph of the Fātimids
Az-Zahir of Aleppo, son of Saladin, leader of Ayyubid dynasty
Az-Zahir (Abbasid caliph) (1176–1226), Abbasid Caliph in Baghdad from 1225 to 1226
al-Ẓāhir Baybars (ruled 1260–77), Mamluk sultan of Egypt and Syria
az-Zahir Sayf ad-Din Barquq (died 1399), first sultan of the Mamluk Burji dynasty
Zahir-ud-Din Babur (1483–1531), established the Mughal dynasty in India in 1526
Zahir al-Umar, virtual Arab ruler of northern Palestine in the 18th century
Mohammed Zahir Shah (1914–2007), last king of Afghanistan
Zaheer Abbas (born 1947), Pakistani cricketer
Zaheer Khan (born 1978), Indian cricketer
Zahir Pajaziti (born 1962), KLA Commander

Places
Zahir Mosque, Kedah's state mosque in Alor Setar

See also
Zaheer (name), Urdu spelling
Abdul Zahir (disambiguation)
Zahir al-Din (disambiguation)

Arabic masculine given names